The Polish Fighting Team (PFT), also known as "Skalski's Circus", was a Polish unit which fought alongside the British Commonwealth Desert Air Force in the North African Campaign of World War II, during 1943. Its nickname was derived from its commanding officer, F/Lt Stanisław Skalski.

History

In late 1942 Polish Air Force Staff Command requested RAF permission to send a group of specially chosen pilots to the North African theatre of operations to acquire experience in operating as a part of a tactical air force in preparation for future Allied landings on the European continent.

Volunteers had to be experienced (with at least 30 operation missions completed) and some 70 volunteers were considered before 15 pilots were chosen for the operational tour of 3 months.

Formed at Northolt on 5 February 1943 as the Polish Fighting Team, initial preparations for overseas service took place at RAF West Kirby, and the unit embarked on 24 February, arriving in Tunisia on 13 March 1943.

The team was initially attached as 'C' flight, to No. 145 Squadron RAF of flying ace S/L Lance Wade (another non-Commonwealth enlistee), equipped with the Spitfire Mk V and operating from Bou Grara Airfield, 150 miles west of Tripoli.

Commencing operations on 18 March the unit gained an immediate reputation for combat effectiveness. The unit re-equipped with the Spitfire Mark IX in late March.

Flying officer Mieczysław Wyszkowski was the only casualty in the PFT, shot down and taken prisoner-of-war on 18 April. Following the surrender of the German Army in Africa on 13 May, the PFT was disbanded.

Three pilots stayed on and became part of Desert Air Force units; Skalski became Commanding officer (CO) of No. 601 Squadron, Horbaczewski CO of No. 43 and Drecki a Flight Commander in No. 152.

Locations
 13 March 1943 - Bou Grara Airfield
 11 April 1943 - La Fauconnerie Airfield ( inland from Sfax)
 15 April 1943 - Goubrine Airfield
 6 May 1943 - Hergla Airfield
 20 May 1943 - Ben Gardane Airfield

Squadron equipment
 15 March 1943 - Supermarine Spitfire F. Vb Tropicalised and Vc (inter alia: AB168, ER539 -7)
 23 March - 26 May 1943 - Supermarine Spitfire F. IXc (inter alia: EN261 -10, EN267 -5, EN268 -7, EN286 -8, EN300 -9, EN315 -6, EN361 -3, EN459 -1)

Scores

Personnel 
F/Lt Stanisław Skalski (CO) (claimed 3-1-0)
F/Lt Waclaw Król (2i/c) (3-0-0)
F/O Bohdan Arct (1-1-2)
F/O Wladyslaw Drecki (1-0-1)
F/O Eugeniusz Horbaczewski (5-0-0)
F/O Jan Kowalski
F/O Ludwik Martel (1-1-1)
F/O Karol Pniak
F/O Kazimierz Sporny (3-0-0)
F/O Mieczyslaw Wyszkowski (POW on April 18) (0-1-0)
W/O Marcin Machowiak (1-0-2)
W/O Wladyslaw Majchrzyk (1-0-1)
W/O Bronislaw Malinowski (2-0-1)
W/O Mieczyslaw Popek (2-0-1)
W/O Kazimierz Sztramko(3-0-0)

See also
 Polish Air Force
 Polish contribution to World War II

Notes

References
 Bohdan Arct: Cyrk Skalskiego Warsaw, 1970, MON

Squadrons of the Polish Air Force
Military units and formations of Poland in World War II
Military units and formations established in 1943
Military units and formations disestablished in 1943